Guyver may refer to:

 Guyver (surname), a surname (and list of people with that surname)
 Bio Booster Armor Guyver, a manga series that began in 1985 by Yoshiki Takaya and inspired several motion picture adaptations:
 Guyver: Out of Control, a 1986 animated feature film
 The Guyver: Bio-Booster Armor, a 1989 12-episode OVA series
 The Guyver, a 1991 live action film
 Guyver: Dark Hero, a 1994 live action film and sequel to the 1991 film
 Guyver: The Bioboosted, a 2005 26-episode anime series